{{Infobox person
|name          = Mark Rothman
|image         = 
|caption       = 
|birth_name    = Mark Harvey Rothman
|birth_date    = 
|birth_place   = The Bronx, New York, US
|death_date    =
|death_place   =
|occupation    = Screenwriter, television comedy writer, producer
|years_active  = 1960s—present 
|spouse        = 
|children      =
|awards        =
|known_for     = Staff writer for and co-producer of ABC-TV's Laverne and ShirleyHead writer for ABC-TV's The Odd Couple and Happy DaysWriter for CBS-TV's The Ted Knight Show  Co-creator, co-executive producer, and a writer for the 1977 CBS-TV series Busting Loose 
|website       = http://markrothmansblog.blogspot.com
}}
Mark Harvey Rothman (born November 1, 1947) is an American writer best known for having been involved with the creation and production of Laverne and Shirley.  He was also the head writer and show runner of numerous other shows including Happy Days and The Odd Couple.

He was co-creator, co-executive producer, and a writer for the 1977 situation comedy Busting Loose and the 1978 situation comedy The Ted Knight Show. He also composed the theme song for Busting Loose. He was also writer, theme tune composer and executive producer for The Lovebirds.

He has written many screenplays and several plays,  including The Wearing of the Greens, and Who Wants Fame?. His first play Excess Baggage, was well received. He currently lives in Farmington Hills, Michigan. In the spring of 2008, he appeared in the title role of a new musical, The Brain From Planet X in Los Angeles, where he and the show received unanimous raves.

He has two books "Show Runner - My Life and Opinions In and Out of the Sitcom Trenches", and "Show Runner Two". Both are collections of autobiographical essays.
 
In 2013 he had his first novel, "I'm Not Garbo," published. It is a fable about Hollywood in the 1930s.

Filmography
 The Odd Couple - Writer
 Happy Days - Writer/ Producer/ Executive Script Consultant
 Paul Sands in Friends and Lovers - Writer
 Laverne & Shirley - Creator/ Writer/ Producer/ Executive Script Consultant
 Busting Loose - Creator/ Writer/ Executive Producer
 Walking Walter - Writer
 The Rita Moreno Show - Creator/ Writer/ Executive Producer 
 America 2100 - Creator
 The Lovebirds - Creator/ Writer/ Executive Producer
 Makin'it - Creator/ Writer/ Executive Producer/ Director 
 It's a Living - Creator and Writer
 The New Odd Couple - Writer/ Supervising Producer
 The Jeffersons - Writer
 She's the Sheriff - Creator/ Writer/ Executive Producer/ Director
 The Further Adventures of Wally Brown - Executive Producer
 The Ted Knight Show - Executive Producer

As per imdb.

References

External links
 
 http://markrothmansblog.blogspot.com
 

1939 births
Living people
Television producers from New York City
American television writers
American male television writers
Writers from the Bronx
Showrunners
Screenwriters from New York (state)